Mikhaylovka is a rural locality (a selo) and the administrative center of Mikhaylovsky Selsoviet, Kharabalinsky District, Astrakhan Oblast, Russia. The population was 1,189 as of 2010. There are 14 streets.

Geography 
It is located on the Akhtuba River, 42 km north-west from Kharabali.

References 

Rural localities in Kharabalinsky District